A Night of Nightmares is a 2012 American horror thriller film directed by Buddy Giovinazzo, starring Marc Senter, Elissa Dowling and Jason London.

Cast
 Marc Senter as Mark Lighthouse
 Elissa Dowling as Ginger
 Jason London as Phil Crater
 Richard Portnow as Cliff Tanner
 Margaux Lancaster as Ruthie Le Mans

Release
The film premiered at the Fantasia International Film Festival on 26 July 2022.

Reception
Chris Bumbray of JoBlo.com rated the film 7 out of 10, calling it a "solid little thriller". Mark L. Miller of Ain't it Cool News wrote a positive review of the film, writing that "It’s extremely effective in amplifying mood and tension, made more so by the lead actors and the director’s patient camera." Michael Gingold of Fangoria wrote a positive review of the film, writing that "The real secret of A Night of Nightmares’ success, though, is its pair of personable, idiosyncratic protagonists. Mark and Ginger are believable both as a potential couple and as they physically struggle with, and try to think their way out of, their horrific situation, and the fact that we want them to get together even before the haunting starts makes us want that much more for them to overcome it." Film critic Anton Bitel wrote a positive review of the film, calling it "One of the most creepily charming horror films of the last decade".

References

External links
 
 

American horror thriller films
2012 horror thriller films